Gresswiller (or ) is a commune in the Bas-Rhin department in Grand Est in northeastern France.

Geography

Adjacent communes
Mollkirch, Rosenwiller, Dinsheim-sur-Bruche, Heiligenberg, and Mutzig.

Notable people
Auguste Dubois, painter and engraver (1892–1973) was born at Gresswiller.  Between 1920 and 1922 he worked closely with Ettore Bugatti whose automobile factory was located at nearby Molsheim.

Landmarks

Unusually, Gresswiller has its own orrery.

See also
 Communes of the Bas-Rhin department

References

Communes of Bas-Rhin
Bas-Rhin communes articles needing translation from French Wikipedia